American terrorism may refer to:
 United States and state-sponsored terrorism, terrorism allegedly sponsored by the US government
 United States and state terrorism, terrorism allegedly conducted by the US government
 Domestic terrorism in the United States, terrorism allegedly carried out in the US by American citizens
 Terrorism in the United States, terrorism alleged to have occurred within the borders of the US

See also 
 List of designated terrorist groups